The 63rd Evening Standard Theatre Awards were awarded in recognition of the 2016–17 London Theatre season on 3 December 2017 at the Theatre Royal, Drury Lane. The shortlist for the Radio 2 Audience Award for Best Musical was announced in October 2017, and the full list of nominees was announced in November 2017. The ceremony was presented by Phoebe Waller-Bridge and co-hosted by Cate Blanchett, Evgeny Lebedev, Lin-Manuel Miranda and Anna Wintour.

Eligibility and nominators 
The advisory judging panel consisted of Daily Mail columnist Baz Bamigboye, WhatsOnStage theatre critic Sarah Crompton, Evening Standard chief theatre critic Henry Hitchings, The Guardian culture writer and broadcaster Mark Lawson, The New York Times International theatre critic Matt Wolf and Evening Standard editor George Osborne.

Ceremony

Presenters 

 Cate Blanchett presented the Natasha Richardson Award for Best Actress
 Sarah Burton presented Best Design
 Jez Butterworth presented the Charles Wintour Award for Most Promising Playwright
 Jeremy Irvine and Allison Williams presented the Radio 2 Audience Award for Best Musical
 Cush Jumbo presented the Emerging Talent Award
 Helen McCrory presented Best Director
 Lin-Manuel Miranda presented Best Play
 Ruth Negga presented Best Actor
 Zendaya presented Best Musical Performance

Performances 

 Arinzé Kene performed "A Change Is Gonna Come"
 The cast of Everybody's Talking About Jamie performed

Sponsors 
The ceremony was held in association with Qatar Airways and the 'Platinum Partner' was Michael Kors.

The following awards were presented in partnership:

 Best Play was awarded in partnership with Hiscox, the official Evening Standard arts partner
 Best Actor was awarded in partnership with the Ambassador Theatre Group
 The Natasha Richardson Award for Best Actress was awarded in partnership with Christian Louboutin

The Really Useful Theatres Group were also event partners.

Winners and nominees

Multiple awards 
3 awards

 The Ferryman

Multiple nominations 
4 nominations

 The Ferryman

3 nominations

 Follies
 Ink

2 nominations

 Albion
 An American in Paris
 Bat Out of Hell: The Musical
 Dreamgirls
 Hamlet

See also 

 2016 Laurence Olivier Awards
 2017 Laurence Olivier Awards

References 

Evening Standard Theatre Awards ceremonies
2017 theatre awards
2017 awards in the United Kingdom
November 2017 events in the United Kingdom